Georgia Vasileiadou (1897 – 12 February 1980) was a Greek actress. She appeared in more than forty films from 1930 to 1977.

Selected filmography

References

External links 

1897 births
1980 deaths
Greek film actresses
Actresses from Athens